is a former Japanese football player.

Playing career
Sasaki was born in Morioka on July 9, 1973. After graduating from high school, he joined Japan Football League club Fujita Industries (later Bellmare Hiratsuka) in 1992. The club won the champions in 1993 and was promoted to J1 League. However he could hardly play in the match behind Kiyoto Furushima and Nobuyuki Kojima. In 1998, he moved to Avispa Fukuoka on loan. However he could not play at all in the match behind Hideki Tsukamoto. In 1999, he moved to new club Yokohama FC in Japan Football League. However he could hardly play in the match behind Takaya Oishi. He retired end of 1999 season.

Club statistics

References

External links

1973 births
Living people
Association football people from Iwate Prefecture
Japanese footballers
J1 League players
Japan Football League (1992–1998) players
Japan Football League players
Shonan Bellmare players
Avispa Fukuoka players
Yokohama FC players
Association football goalkeepers